is a Japanese actor and television personality affiliated with Johnny & Associates.

Biography
In 1997, when Kazama was in his second year of junior high school, he entered Johnny & Associates and started activities as a trainee. He made his debut on stage that same year in a Shonentai stage play.
In 1999, he played Kenjiro Kanesue in Kinpachi-sensei. His performance earned him the Nikkan Sports Drama Grand Prix award for Best Newcomer.

In 2002, Kazama formed a unit, "4TOPS" with fellow trainees Tomohisa Yamashita, Toma Ikuta, and Jun Hasegawa. The quartet hosted Shounen Club, a Johnny's Jr. variety show. In September 2003, Yamashita was chosen to be a member of a new unit, News. 4TOPS was dissolved with News' debut and the remaining members would focus on acting.
In 2011, Kazama won a Television Drama Academy Award for Best Supporting Actor.

Kazama married a non-celebrity woman in 2013, after dating for ten years.

He was also a member of TU→YU along with V6's Hiroshi Nagano, NEWS's Takahisa Masuda, Hey! Say! JUMP's Hikaru Yaotome and actor Tatsuya Takeda.

He starred in the feature-length film Maebashi Visual Kei, as a young farmer who tries to make it big in a visual kei band.

On December 22, 2020, Kazama's talent agency, Johnny & Associates, announced that he had tested positive for COVID-19. He made a full recovery on January 4.

Filmography

Film

Television

Animation
Yu-Gi-Oh! Duel Monsters (2000−2004) − Yugi Mutou/Yami Yugi
Yu-Gi-Oh! Duel Monsters GX (2004−2008) − Yugi Mutou/Yami Yugi
Yu-Gi-Oh! The Movie: Pyramid of Light (2005) − Yugi Mutou/Yami Yugi
Yu-Gi-Oh!: Bonds Beyond Time (2010) − Yugi Mutou/Yami Yugi
From Up On Poppy Hill (2011) − Shirō Mizunuma & Hiroshi Tachibana.
Yu-Gi-Oh!: The Dark Side of Dimensions (2016) − Yugi Mutou/Yami Yugi

Video Games 

 Yu-Gi-Oh! Duel Links (2016) − Yugi Mutou/Yami Yugi
 Jump Force (2019) − Yugi Mutou/Yami Yugi

Stage

Awards

References

External links
 Shunsuke Kazama at GamePlaza-Haruka Voice Acting Database 
 Shunsuke Kazama at Hitoshi Doi's Seiyuu Database
 
 

1983 births
Living people
Japanese male actors
Japanese male musical theatre actors
Japanese male stage actors
Japanese male video game actors
Japanese male child actors
Japanese male voice actors
Japanese television personalities
Johnny & Associates
Male voice actors from Tokyo